Inermocoelotes anoplus is a funnel-web spider genus found in Austria, Italy and Eastern Europe.

See also 
 List of Agelenidae species

References

External links 

Inermocoelotes
Spiders of Europe
Spiders described in 1897